In baseball statistics, the term times on base (TOB), is the cumulative total number of times a batter has reached base as a result of a hit, base on balls, or hit by pitch. This statistic does not include times reaching base by way of an error, uncaught third strike, fielder's obstruction or a fielder's choice, making the statistic somewhat of a misnomer.

Times on base leaders in Major League Baseball

Career

As of the end of the 2021 season, the following are the top 10 players in career times on base.
 Pete Rose – 5929
 Barry Bonds – 5599
 Ty Cobb – 5532
 Rickey Henderson – 5343
 Carl Yastrzemski – 5304
 Stan Musial – 5282
 Hank Aaron – 5205
 Tris Speaker – 4998
 Babe Ruth – 4978
 Eddie Collins – 4891

Single-season
 Babe Ruth, Yankees (1923) – 379
 Barry Bonds, Giants (2004) – 376
 Ted Williams, Red Sox (1949) – 358
 Barry Bonds, Giants (2002) – 356
 Billy Hamilton, Phillies (1894) – 355
 Babe Ruth, Yankees (1921) – 353
 Babe Ruth, Yankees (1924) – 346
 Ted Williams, Red Sox (1947) – 345
 Three players are tied for ninth:
 Lou Gehrig, Yankees (1936) -342
 Wade Boggs, Red Sox (1988) – 342
 Barry Bonds, Giants (2001) – 342

Single game
Three players have had 9 TOB in a single game:
Max Carey, July 7, 1922 – six hits, three walks (18-inning game)
Johnny Burnett, July 10, 1932 – nine hits (18-inning game)
Stan Hack, August 9, 1942 – five hits, four walks (18-inning game)

Burnett's nine hits are the record for most hits in a single game in MLB history, albeit in extra innings.

See also
 On-base percentage (OBP), which is the ratio of TOB to the sum of at bats, base on balls, hit by pitch, and sacrifice flies

References

External links
 All-time career leaders from baseball-reference.com
 All-time single-season leaders from baseball-reference.com

Batting statistics
Baseball terminology